The Union Depot and Freight House in Anniston, Calhoun County, Alabama is a building listed on the National Register of Historic Places.

References

National Register of Historic Places in Calhoun County, Alabama
Railway stations on the National Register of Historic Places in Alabama
Railway stations in the United States opened in 1885
Buildings and structures in Anniston, Alabama
Railway freight houses on the National Register of Historic Places
Railway buildings and structures on the National Register of Historic Places in Alabama
Transportation buildings and structures in Calhoun County, Alabama
Anniston
Former railway stations in Alabama